Hiniphis is a genus of mites in the family Ologamasidae. There are at least two described species in Hiniphis.

Species
These two species belong to the genus Hiniphis:
 Hiniphis bipala Lee, 1973
 Hiniphis hinnus Lee, 1970

References

Ologamasidae